Proteoteras (boxelder twig borer moth) is a genus of moths belonging to the subfamily Olethreutinae of the family Tortricidae.

Species
Proteoteras aesculana Riley, 1881
Proteoteras arizonae Kearfott, 1907
Proteoteras crescentana Kearfott, 1907
Proteoteras implicata Heinrich, 1924
Proteoteras moffatiana Fernald, 1905
Proteoteras naracana Kearfott, 1907
Proteoteras obnigrana Heinrich, 1923
Proteoteras willingana (Kearfott, 1904)

See also
List of Tortricidae genera

References

External links
tortricidae.com

Eucosmini
Tortricidae genera